David Brown Automotive is a British manufacturer of limited edition automobiles in Silverstone, England, belonging to British businessman David Brown. The company began in Coventry in 2013 and moved to a new 18,000 sq ft dedicated build facility and headquarters at Silverstone Park in April 2017.

The company announced the Speedback GT, its first production model, in March 2014. With the unveiling of the vehicle at the Top Marques show in Monaco in April of that same year. Despite sharing a similar background in engineering, and the same name as the previous owner of Aston Martin, there is no family connection between the two companies.

Mini Remastered, a modern reinterpretation of a classic Mini, is the company's second model, launched in Shoreditch, London, on 6 April 2017.

The company showcased Speedback GT at the Geneva International Motor Show in 2017, and 2018, alongside two prototypes of Mini Remastered and the newly launched Speedback Silverstone Edition.

Speedback GT

The Speedback GT is the first model announced by David Brown Automotive. Launched at the Top Marques Show in Monaco in April 2014, it is the 1960s-inspired Grand Tourer, coachbuilt using the Jaguar XK all-aluminium platform. The entire car is handcrafted using traditional coachbuilding techniques over a period of 8,000 hours, with the aluminium panels being individually hand-rolled on an English wheel. The price as of April 2018 is £520,000.00 GBP plus local taxes. The company proudly sources its production to British-based suppliers and builds the cars at their new build facility in Silverstone, UK. The company has announced that they will never produce more than 100 Speedback GTs.

The Speedback GT was designed by former Jaguar Land Rover designer Alan Mobberley. The bespoke body of each Speedback GT is produced using traditional coach building methods; the aluminium body panels are hand beaten and then rolled over an english wheel. The bucks over which the panels are beaten have been milled out using a 5-axis CNC milling machine from CAD data, obtained from the full-size design clay model.

The powertrain is a 5.0-litre Jaguar AJ-V8 engine generating  with a six-speed ZF automatic transmission.

At the Geneva International Motor Show in 2017, the Speedback GT was showcased in two specifications, one left-hand and one right-hand drive. These full-production specification examples encompassed over 230 engineering and design refinements from the original Speedback GT prototype, including soft-close door technology, refined interior and exterior fit and finish and enhanced noise insulation.

Speedback Silverstone Edition

Launched on 6 March 2018 at the Geneva International Motor Show, the Speedback Silverstone Edition is the third particular edition model made by David Brown behind both the Mini Remastered Café Racers Edition and Monte Carlo Edition.

Limited to 10 examples globally, the Speedback Silverstone Edition is a performance-focused version of the company's first model, the Speedback GT, and celebrates the company's first anniversary of its move to the new Silverstone build facility and headquarters in April 2017.

Updated rear suspension adds further dynamic handling to the model, over the existing set-up from Speedback GT.

Each of the 10 Speedback Silverstone Edition examples will be built to the same specification, with just left-hand and right-hand drive and 2-seater or 2+2 configuration differences.

A bespoke 'Fly by Night' paint finish, applied over 8 weeks is offered on Speedback Silverstone Edition, with a subtle, fading 'Black Night' painted stripe across the length of the body, while the interior cockpit is trimmed in an exclusive 'Antique' tan leather, with brogueing and fluting to the seats, evocative of the 1960s cars and aircraft that the car is inspired by. Premium Kvadrat Remix fabrics and 'Scorched Ebony Macassar' wood veneers are also specified in the interior.

Mini Remastered

Mini Remastered is the second model by David Brown Automotive, and is a remastering of the original Mini, built between 1958 and 2000. Mini Remastered was launched at a private event in Shoreditch, London in April 2017, and made its world motor show debut on 20 April 2017 at the Top Marques Show in Monaco.

Launched in three specifications, Mini Remastered was showcased in standard form, alongside two limited-production special editions: Mini Remastered, Inspired by Café Racers, taking inspiration from the classic 1950s motorbike movement, and Mini Remastered, Inspired by Monte Carlo, taking inspiration from the racing heritage of the classic Mini on which the cars are based.

An all-new steel body shell is bespoke-made by British Motor Heritage, which is then coachbuilt and refined by David Brown Automotive. The shell is de-seamed, every panel gap is profiled and panels are welded together for a uniform shape. Every car goes through a rust-proofing electrophoretic deposition 'E-coat' process and a 4-week paint process. Customers are able to develop their own bespoke paint finish, or choose a paint finish developed exclusively for David Brown Automotive already.

Interior technology and connectivity are added to Mini Remastered, including electric power-assisted steering, air conditioning, electric start/stop button, remote central locking, full LED lighting and a 7-inch touchscreen infotainment system with Apple® CarPlay®, satellite navigation, 3G, 4G, Bluetooth® and DAB connectivity.

Mini Remastered is available globally in both left-hand and right-hand drives.

See also
 List of car manufacturers of the United Kingdom

References

External links

Car manufacturers of the United Kingdom
Car brands
Luxury motor vehicle manufacturers
Vehicle manufacturing companies established in 2013
2013 establishments in England